Abu al-Rafi ibn Abu al-Huqayq was a chieftain of the Jewish tribes of the Khaybar oasis. When Al-Huqayq approached neighbouring tribes to raise an army to attack Muslims, they assassinated him, aided by an Arab who spoke a Jewish dialect. His brothers the famous poets Al-Rabi ibn Abu al-Huqayq and Sallam ibn Abu al-Huqayq were also assassinated at Muhammad's orders.

He succeeded Huyayy ibn Akhtab who was killed in 627 CE alongside Banu Qurayza. He was succeeded by Usayr ibn Zarim.

Notes

7th-century deaths
Assassinated Jews
Banu Nadir
7th-century Arabian Jews
Year of birth missing
Year of death missing
Opponents of Muhammad